George Graham (12 July 1903 – 12 June 1983) was an Australian rules footballer who played with Hawthorn in the Victorian Football League (VFL).

Notes

External links 

1903 births
1983 deaths
Australian rules footballers from Victoria (Australia)
Hawthorn Football Club players